The Gorsexio Viaduct is located on the A26 motorway (European route E25) between Genoa and Mele, in Italy.

It was projected by Silvano Zorzi, Giorgio Grasselli and Enrico Faro, and built between 1972 and 1978 by the Cooperativa Muratori e Cementisti.

Bibliography
 Viadotto sul torrente Gorsexio per l'autostrada Voltri-Alessandria, in L'Industria Italiana del Cemento, anno XLVIII, nº 4, Roma, AITEC, April 1978, pp. 214–219, ISSN 0019-7637

External links 
 Structurae

Buildings and structures in Genoa
Transport in Genoa
Bridges completed in 1978
Concrete bridges
Road bridges in Italy
Viaducts
European route E25